19 de Abril is a town in Rocha Department in Uruguay.  19 de Abril had 205 inhabitants in 2011.

References

External links
 Census 2011

Populated places in the Rocha Department